The year 1847 in architecture involved some significant architectural events and new buildings.

Events
 May – The Architectural Association School of Architecture is founded in London.

Buildings and structures

Buildings opened

 March 31 – The first mass is celebrated in St. Patrick's Basilica, Montreal, designed by Pierre-Louis Morin and Father Félix Martin.
 April 15 – Lords Chamber in the Palace of Westminster in London, rebuilt to the design of Charles Barry with decoration by Augustus Pugin.
 June 28 – Trains first use Broadstone railway station in Dublin, Ireland, designed by John Skipton Mulvany.
 June 30 – Water first flows along the Roquefavour Aqueduct in the south of France, engineered by Jean François Mayor de Montricher.
 August 3 – Trains first use Huddersfield railway station in the north of England, designed by James Pigott Pritchett.
 September 10 – Trains first use Carlisle Citadel railway station in the north of England, designed by William Tite.
 November – Trains first use Bury St Edmunds railway station in the east of England, probably designed by Sancton Wood.
 First performance at the Carltheater in Vienna, designed by Eduard van der Nüll and August Sicard von Sicardsburg.

Buildings completed
 Madina Mosque, Murshidabad, West Bengal, India, rebuilt under the supervision of Sadeq Ali Khan.
 St Marie's Church (Roman Catholic), Rugby, England, designed by Augustus Pugin.
 Rectory, Rampisham, Dorset, England, designed by Augustus Pugin.

Awards
 Grand Prix de Rome, architecture – Louis-Jules André.

Births
 March 21 – Fredrik Olaus Lindström, Swedish city architect (died 1919)
 April 16 – Hans Auer, Austrian architect (died 1906)
 June 9 – Alajos Hauszmann, Austro-Hungarian architect and professor (died 1926)
 August 24 – Charles Follen McKim, American architect (died 1909)

 date unknown
 John Beswicke, Australian architect and surveyor (died 1925)
 Alexandru Săvulescu, Romanian architect (died 1902)

Deaths
 March 23 – Archibald Simpson, Scottish architect practicing in Aberdeen (born 1790)
 October 13 – Lewis Nockalls Cottingham, English architect, pioneer in the study of Medieval Gothic architecture (born 1787)
 November 26 – Harvey Lonsdale Elmes, English architect, designer of St George's Hall, Liverpool (born 1814; consumption)

References

Architecture
Years in architecture
19th-century architecture